Chantal Strasser (born 21 March 1978 in Zürich) is a retired female freestyle swimmer from Switzerland. She competed in three consecutive Summer Olympics for her native country, starting in 1996 in Atlanta, Georgia.

References
 

1978 births
Living people
Swiss female freestyle swimmers
Swimmers at the 1996 Summer Olympics
Swimmers at the 2000 Summer Olympics
Swimmers at the 2004 Summer Olympics
Olympic swimmers of Switzerland
European Aquatics Championships medalists in swimming
Sportspeople from Zürich
20th-century Swiss women
21st-century Swiss women